Michael Gurnis is the John E. and Hazel S. Smits Professor of Geophysics at the California Institute of Technology.

Gurnis served as director of the Computational Infrastructure for Geodynamics (CIG), an NSF-funded institute operated by Caltech which supports and promotes Earth science by developing and maintaining open-source software for computational geophysics and related fields.

Gurnis was awarded the 2013 Agustus Love Medal for fundamental contributions to geodynamics from the European Geosciences Union.

External links 
 Michael Gurnis' Caltech Home Page
 Michael Gurnis' 2013 Augustus Love Medal citation

California Institute of Technology faculty
Living people
Year of birth missing (living people)